Isla Mujeres (Spanish for "Women Island" (formally “Isla de Mujeres”) is an island where the Gulf of Mexico and the Caribbean Sea meet, about  off the Yucatán Peninsula coast in the State of Quintana Roo, Mexico. To the east is the Caribbean Sea with a strong surf and rocky coast, and to the west the skyline of Cancún can be seen across the waters. In the 2010 census, the namesake town on the island had a population of 12,642 inhabitants. The town is the seat of Isla Mujeres Municipality.

Very little violent crime has been reported on the island over its history, leading the island to gain a reputation for its relaxed nature, with the safety of both residents and tourists being unusually high. The biggest danger to the residents of the island has historically been the threat of tropical storms and hurricanes, some of which have caused devastating damage, such as Hurricane Carmen and Hurricane Wilma.

History

In Pre-Columbian times the island was sacred to the Maya goddess of childbirth and medicine, Ixchel. When the Spanish arrived in the 16th century they named it "Isla Mujeres" because of the many images of goddesses. The first information available about Isla Mujeres is from the period between 564–1516 AD, when it was part of the Maya province called Ekab. There were 4 Maya provinces in what is today the State of Quintana Roo. The Maya also exploited the salt that the island produced in the "salinas" (small interior lagoons). The salt was used not only for the preservation of food and medicine but also as a generally accepted currency for commerce of goods along the whole Maya region. The Maya goddess Ixchel had a temple in what is today the Hacienda Mundaca (Mundaca's Plantation House). The island was also a favorite stopping place for pirates in the early 1800s. The shallow lagoon on the mainland side of the island was a good place for sailors to sit out major storms, careen their hulls and trade for salt. Pirates Henry Morgan, Jean Lafitte and Hernan Mundaca spent time there. Hernan Mundaca lived on the island for quite some time, building a large hacienda with which he hoped to entice a local beauty, Martiniana (Prisca) Gomez Pantoja, into marriage. She married someone else, to his regret. A small bit of his Hacienda is still there. It has served in the past as a zoo.

A small Maya temple was once located on the southern tip of the island. However, in 1988, Hurricane Gilbert caused extensive damage, leaving most of the foundation but only a very small portion of the temple.

Since the 1970s, along with nearby Cancún, there has been substantial tourist development in Isla Mujeres.

Like much of the rest of the tourism industry, Isla Mujeres was economically devastated by the COVID-19 pandemic, although case numbers remained relatively low on the island.

Transportation

Transportation on the island of Isla Mujeres consists primarily of taxis or golf carts and moped scooters.  there were 121 taxis, 500 golf carts, and 1500 moped scooters. There is also a bus service that runs from the downtown to the different neighborhoods, called colonias in Spanish (where most locals live). The island was formerly served by Isla Mujeres National Airport, but the airport and landing strip have since closed. Nowadays, locals, military personnel, and tourists can be seen jogging up and down the runway at various times throughout the day.

Ferry service to the mainland
There are two main ferry boat companies (UltraMar and Jetway) that run to the island from Puerto Juárez, Cancun, or Gran Puerto on the mainland. There are also many party boats that make day trips to Isla Mujeres. The island is popular with day trippers, but activity quiets down in the evening after the tour groups leave.

Tourism

Isla Mujeres has fostered a strong restaurant industry and culture, with many restaurants located throughout the island. There are numerous places to eat fresh seafood cooked with local and traditional recipes, and other restaurants offer Mexican, Yucatecan, Italian, Caribbean, Mediterranean, Israeli, French, Thai, Cuban, and Maya cuisine, among others. Hotel prices vary from cheap to very expensive at the resorts on the southwest end such as Hotel Villa Rolandi, and Playa Norte. In the north is El Centro (downtown), whose central axis, Hidalgo Street, is the main dining and entertainment area. Also located on the north end is a famous beach called Playa Norte, which has recovered quickly since Hurricane Wilma hit the area in 2005. Besides these attractions, swimming with dolphins can also be experienced at the Island.  Isla Mujeres has been a popular location for destination weddings for several decades, with larger hotels on the island sometimes being used to house wedding parties. These weddings are performed throughout the island, primarily at beachside venues on the west or north side of the island, with ceremonies generally taking place on the beach.

The island of Isla Mujeres is located close to one of many coral reefs such as the one located in Garrafon Park, which is an attraction popular for its snorkeling and scuba diving. The Cancún Underwater Museum, created by English sculptor Jason deCaires Taylor, is located off the western coast of Isla Mujeres. Isla Mujeres is also home to a population of sea turtles. Because of the recent endangerment of sea turtles in the area, a facility named Tortugranja was set up on the southern end of the island for their rehabilitation and breeding. This facility is open to the public.

The island's relative proximity to Cuba has made it a popular stepping stone for Cubans trying to reach the United States in recent years.

Isla Mujeres is considered to be one of the best places in the world to catch sailfish.

Life on the island
In addition to the Isla Mujeres' use as a popular day trip spot, many homes have been built on the island, including the homes of those who have lived on the island for generations, affluent condos or houses for seasonal use, snowbirds, fishermen, and those working in the island's tourism and restaurant industry. The island has also enjoyed a dedicated yacht and boating presence through the years, with many docks on the west coast, including some designated for seasonal use. In general, the island's population declines in the summer due to the decline of tourism during that season. Some of the residents on the island ferry to and from Cancún daily in order to attend school or work.

Shopping on the island for residents was limited for many decades, leading day trips to Cancún (sometimes on a specialized ferry for automobiles and shipping trucks) to be a common necessity to purchase items such as a television or foods not stocked at one of the many minisupers (locally run convenience stores) or the downtown supermercado (supermarket) located in the city square. As the tourism industry increased in the later part of the 2000s, businesses such as Chedraui began to establish a presence, providing residents with less need for repeated trips to Cancún.

There are a multitude of stadiums throughout the island, including a full scale baseball park and organized football venue along with makeshift dirt or sand fields which can commonly be seen played on by local children or organized teams. Technology on the island (particularly in the colonias) was humble for many years, with the island slow to widely adopt innovations in entertainment beyond the standard television. By the early '00s, technologies such as cable television, the arcade cabinet (most commonly an original or repurposed Neo Geo) and cellular phones were beginning to become commonplace with local households.

Isla Mujeres is the home of Mexican naval base, Quinta Region Naval.

References

External links

Fideicomiso de Promoción Turística de Isla Mujeres Official tourism website

Mujeres
Mujeres, Islas
Tourism in Mexico
Populated places in islands of Mexico